Freddie Lee Scott (born August 5, 1952) is a former American football wide receiver who played from 1974 through 1983 in the National Football League (NFL). In 2001, he was inducted into the College Football Hall of Fame.

Scott was a starter replacing the injured Roger Carr with the Baltimore Colts in 1977. He was traded along with a fourth-round draft selection (107th overall) which eventually became Homer Elias from the Colts to the Detroit Lions for Herb Orvis on May 1, 1978.

His son, Freddie Scott II also played wide receiver for Penn State University, and in the NFL from 1996 through 1998 for the Detroit Lions and the Indianapolis Colts.  Another son, Brandon Scott, played for Bowling Green State University.

References

External links
Freddie Scott II = website
NFL.com player page

1952 births
Living people
People from Lincoln County, Arkansas
Players of American football from Arkansas
American football wide receivers
Amherst Mammoths football players
College Football Hall of Fame inductees
Baltimore Colts players
Detroit Lions players